Not A Love Story is a 2011 Indian Hindi-language crime thriller film inspired by the murder of Neeraj Grover in 2008 that led to the arrest of Emile Jerome Mathew and Maria Susairaj. Starring Mahie Gill, Deepak Dobriyal and Ajay Gehi and directed by Ram Gopal Varma, the film was released on 19 August 2011. Ram Gopal Varma has announced that the film is not a biopic but is inspired by the case.

The film's shooting was completed in 20 days. One of the prime locations was the building Dheeraj Solitaire where Neeraj Grover was allegedly murdered in 2008.

Cast

 Mahie Gill as Anusha Chawla (based on Maria Susairaj)
 Deepak Dobriyal as Robin Fernandes (Maria's Boyfriend Emile)
 Ajay Gehi as Ashish Bhatnagar
 Zakir Hussain as Inspector Mane
 Neil Bhoopalam as Prem
 Darshan Jariwala as Anusha's lawyer
 Ganesh Yadav as Robin's lawyer
 Rasika Joshi as Ashish's mother
 Prabhleen Sandhu as Anju
 Urmila Matondkar as Item number
 Mahesh Thakur as ad-film maker Sam in a guest role
 Sandesh Jadhav as Inspector Chavan
 Dimple Ghosh as Richa
 Rakesh Kukreti as Prashant
 Abhijeet Lahiri as Ashish's father
 Nandita Puri as Anusha's mother
 Vandana Sajnani as Apeksha, Director
 Sushma Bhagwat as Robin's mother
 Ashok Awasthi as Robin's father
 Shankar Sachdev as Public Prosecutor
 Kamal Adip as Judge
 Rajesh Barsewal as watchman
 Sandeep Bose as Kishen, Producer

Plot 
Standing at 5'6", Chandigarh-born Anusha Chawla, bids adieu to her boyfriend, Robin Fernandes, and re-locates to Mumbai, in order to act in movies. Weeks later she manages to meet a film-maker, Sam, who assures her of a lead role on the condition that she become intimate with him but she walks away. She meets with more disappointment when a movie with Richa gets shelved. Disappointed, she nevertheless continues to audition - encouraged by her new friends, Anju and Prashant - while Robin urges her to return home. She then meets with Ashish Bhatnagar, who puts her on a short-list, eventually gets approval, and signs her in a lead role. Both celebrate in a pub, get intoxicated and end up in bed in her Malad flat. The next day, a delighted Robin, happy with her success, attends at her residence to congratulate and surprise her, is enraged at Ashish and kills him. He subsequently cuts the latter's body in small pieces and the duo borrow Prashant's car, drive to an isolated spot in Dahisar and burn it. Before returning home, Robin instructs her not to tell anyone that he was in Mumbai. Days later, Prashant, Anju and she attend Malad Police Station and notify Inspector Mane that Ashish is missing. After obtaining statements from the trio, the police launch an investigation to try and locate Ashish. Eventually, Mane suspects Anusha, summons her, questions and tortures her, she confesses, and is arrested. Robin is also subsequently arrested, brought to Mumbai, and both are produced in Court.

Music
"Yayi Re Yayi Re, Hoja Rangeela Re" - Tarannum Mallik
"Jab Se Mai Choti Thi" - Sandeep Patil, Dharmaraj Bhatt
"Yayi Re Yayi Re, Hoja Rangeela Re" (Sad) - Tarannum Mallik
"Jab Se Mai Choti Thi" (Sad) - Sandeep Patil, Dharmaraj Bhatt
"Woh Ek Pal Chhina Kal" - Arijit Datta, Neha Kakkar

Reception

Critical response 
The critics' response has been positive to mixed. Taran Adarsh of Bollywood Hungama gave 4 stars out of 5. Subhash K Jha gave 3.5 out of 5. Kaveree Bamzai of India Today gave 3 out of 5. Zee News gave 3 out of 5. Raja Sen of Rediff rated it 1.5 out of 5, saying that it is a film made in bad taste. Harish of Behindwoods rated it 2 out of 5 and said "Overall in the time of stylish filmmaking of no substance movies, RGV tries to differ but with such a wafer-thin but powerful plot-line, you expect the background music, editing and camera work to push it to greatness and that is where the movie falters."

Mayank Shekhar of the Hindustan Times said "it delves deeper into neither the young dream-chasers of a scary celeb industry nor chilling procedurals of an infamous police case", and rated it 2 out of 5. CNN-IBN's Rajeev Masand said "Not A Love Story' is not entirely unwatchable", rating it 2 out of 5, but asserted that it is the "most senseless movie made in Bollywood for a long time." Nupur Barua of fullhyd.com rated it 6/10 and said you can watch the movie if you can digest, visually, blood, gore, violent sex, and constant shaky camera movement.

See also

 Neeraj Grover murder case

References

External links

 

Films directed by Ram Gopal Varma
Films set in Mumbai
2011 films
2011 crime thriller films
Indian crime thriller films
Indian erotic thriller films
2010s erotic thriller films
Hindi-language films based on actual events
Films scored by Sandeep Chowta
Indian films based on actual events
2010s Hindi-language films